Mitchell Wallace was an Australian professional rugby league footballer who played in the 1940s and 1950s.  He played for Balmain Tigers and Parramatta as a winger.

Playing career
Wallace played his junior rugby league with the Balmain Shamrocks and made his first grade debut for Balmain against Newton Rangers at the Sydney Cricket Ground in 1945.  In 1948, Wallace played on the wing for Balmain in the grand final defeat against Western Suburbs.  In 1949, Wallace joined newly admitted club Parramatta.  Despite the side languishing near the bottom of the ladder each year, Wallace finished as the top try scorer at the club in each of the four seasons he played there with most of his try scoring records standing until the club's golden era in the 1980s.

References

1922 births
2016 deaths
Balmain Tigers players
Parramatta Eels players
Australian rugby league players
Rugby league players from Sydney
Rugby league wingers